Ashley Spencer Wright (born 21 October 1980) is an English cricketer. Wright played as a right-handed batsman who bowled right-arm medium-pace. He later went on to represent the Guernsey cricket team. He is currently serving as the batting coach for Pakistan Super League franchise Islamabad United.

Career in England
Wright made his List-A debut for the Leicestershire Cricket Board in the 1999 NatWest Trophy.  From 1999 to 2001, he 3 List-A matches for the board, making his highest List-A career score of 112 against the Durham Cricket Board in the 2000 NatWest Trophy.

Wright made his first-class debut for Leicestershire in 2001 against the touring Pakistanis.  Wright played 6 first-class matches for the county, with his final first-class match for Leicestershire coming against Surrey in the 2002 County Championship.  As well as playing first-class cricket for Leicestershire, Wright also played 9 List-A matches for the county from 2001 to 2002, with his last List-A match for the county coming against Worcestershire in the 2002 Norwich Union League.

In 2004, Wright played his final career List-A match in his only List-A appearance for Lincolnshire in the 2004 Cheltenham & Gloucester Trophy against Glamorgan.  In 2005, he played a single Minor Counties Championship match for Staffordshire against Bedfordshire.

Career in Guernsey
In January 2016, Wright was appointed director of cricket for the Guernsey Cricket Board (GCB), a position which includes the role of head coach of the Guernsey national team. He succeeded Nic Pothas.

In May 2019, he was named in Guernsey's squad for the 2019 T20 Inter-Insular Cup. He made his Twenty20 International (T20I) debut for Guernsey against Jersey on 31 May 2019. The same month, he was named in Guernsey's squad for the Regional Finals of the 2018–19 ICC T20 World Cup Europe Qualifier tournament in Guernsey.

Family
Ashley's brother Luke Wright currently plays county cricket for Sussex and plays ODI and Twenty20 International cricket for England.  Luke formerly played his county cricket for Leicestershire.

References

External links
Ashley Wright at Cricinfo
Ashley Wright at CricketArchive

1980 births
Living people
People from Grantham
English cricketers
Guernsey cricketers
Guernsey Twenty20 International cricketers
Leicestershire Cricket Board cricketers
Leicestershire cricketers
Lincolnshire cricketers
Staffordshire cricketers
English cricket coaches
Cricketers from Lincolnshire
Cricketers from Leicestershire